The 2005 WTA Tour was the elite professional tennis circuit organized by the Women's Tennis Association (WTA) for the 2005 tennis season. The 2005 WTA Tour included the four Grand Slam tournaments, the WTA Tour Championships and the WTA Tier I, Tier II, Tier III, Tier IV and Tier V events. ITF tournaments were not part of the WTA Tour, although they award points for the WTA World Ranking.

Season summary

Singles
Going into 2005, Lindsay Davenport was holding the No. 1 ranking and therefore was the top seed at the year's first Grand Slam, the Australian Open. She reached the final for the first time since she won the event in 2000, coming back against Alicia Molik in the quarterfinals and Nathalie Dechy in the semifinals. Molik had a successful warm-up by winning the tournament in Sydney. Meanwhile, Serena Williams came through in the bottom half, beating Amélie Mauresmo and Maria Sharapova. In the final, Williams won her seventh Grand Slam title, and first since Wimbledon 2003. Justine Henin-Hardenne and Kim Clijsters both continued to struggle with injuries and skipped the event.

The following week, Sharapova won the event in Tokyo, beating Davenport in the final. Moving into February, Mauresmo proved strong, winning in Antwerp and reaching the Paris final before losing to Dinara Safina. Sharapova also won the event in Doha, with Davenport winning in Dubai. Molik reached the semifinals of Antwerp and the final of Doha to continue her strong start to the season. Clijsters returned to competition in Antwerp, losing to Venus Williams.

Clijsters then won 14 straight matches to take back-to-back titles in Indian Wells and Miami. In the former, she beat Davenport (who had defeated Maria Sharapova 6–0, 6–0 in the semi-finals) in the final. In the latter, she beat Sharapova in the final. Clijsters was only the second woman to achieve the feat of winning both tournaments, after Steffi Graf in 1996.

Henin-Hardenne returned to competitive tennis in Miami, where she lost to Sharapova, but she then went on to dominate the clay season, winning events in Charleston, Warsaw and Berlin and building a 17-match winning streak. In the other big clay tournament in Rome, Mauresmo came out as the champion. Also enjoying good results in the clay season were Nadia Petrova, who reached the final of Berlin and the semifinals of Amelia Island and Patty Schnyder, who reached the semifinals of Berlin and Charleston, and the final of Rome. Davenport won the title in Amelia Island.

As the favourite to win the French Open title, Henin-Hardenne reached the final, saving match points against Kuznetsova in the fourth round, before beating Sharapova in the quarterfinals. In the semifinals, she beat Petrova. On the top half of the draw, Mary Pierce moved through to her first Grand Slam final since 2000 by defeating Davenport in the quarterfinals and then Elena Likhovtseva in the semifinals. Henin-Hardenne eventually won her fourth Grand Slam title, beating Pierce with the loss of only two games.

Wimbledon opened up with an early upset, as Henin-Hardenne became the first French Open champion to crash out in the first round, losing to Eleni Daniilidou, who brought an end to the Belgian's 24-match win streak. Australian Open champion Serena Williams also continued her struggles since that title, losing in the third round to Jill Craybas. In the semifinals, Venus Williams beat defending champion Sharapova, while Davenport moved past Mauresmo in a tight match. The final turned out to be the longest women's final in Wimbledon history, with Williams saving a match point before going on to win her third Wimbledon title, after 2000 and 2001.

The summer hardcourt season saw a strong run from Kim Clijsters, who won titles in Stanford, Los Angeles and Toronto. Her only loss in the lead-up to the U.S. Open came against Peng Shuai in San Diego. In the absence of Clijsters, Mary Pierce won that event, beating Ai Sugiyama in the final. Lindsay Davenport took the title in New Haven, over Mauresmo in the final.

Maria Sharapova became the first Russian, male or female, to be ranked World No. 1 by the WTA Tour; she claimed the ranking on 22 August, though Lindsay Davenport would reclaim the ranking the following week. Sharapova would herself recapture the top ranking following the US Open, despite losing in the semi-finals to Kim Clijsters. She would hold it until the end of the season, when again Davenport took over at the top.

After a struggling season up until now, Svetlana Kuznetsova went into her U.S. Open title defense in poor form, and subsequently lost on the very first day, becoming the first defending women's champion to lose in the first round. 2003 champion Henin-Hardenne lost to Mary Pierce in the fourth round, while Venus Williams beat her sister, Serena, in the fourth round, before losing to Clijsters in the quarterfinals. Eventually, Clijsters beat Sharapova to reach the final. On the bottom half of the draw, Pierce followed up her upset of Henin-Hardenne with wins over Mauresmo and Dementieva, who beat Davenport in the quarterfinals, to reach her second Grand Slam final of the year. There, she lost to Clijsters, who finally won her first Grand Slam title after losing in four finals previously.

The fall season started with a surprise final in Beijing, with Maria Kirilenko beating Anna-Lena Grönefeld to win the event. Grönefeld also reached the final in Luxembourg, where she lost to Clijsters. Davenport won three tournaments in the last stretch of the year in Bali, Stuttgart and Zurich to secure the year end No. 1 ranking for the second straight season. Mary Pierce won her second Tier I event of the season in the Moscow event. Nadia Petrova won her first title after several lost finals in Linz, and Amélie Mauresmo won her third straight title in Philadelphia. It also proved a successful period for Patty Schnyder, who was the runner-up in Zurich and Linz, and Francesca Schiavone, who recorded three runner-up finishes in Bali, Hasselt and Moscow. Nicole Vaidišová won three smaller titles in three weeks in Seoul, Tokyo and Bangkok respectively.

In the big finish to the season, the year-ending championships, Mauresmo beat Pierce to win her biggest career title up to that point, with Davenport and Sharapova reaching the semifinals. Petrova, Dementieva, Clijsters and Schnyder were the other qualifiers.

Notable breakthrough players
The 2005 season saw the breakthrough of 17-year-old Serbian Ana Ivanovic into the WTA Tour. Starting the season ranked World No. 97 (an increase of 608 places from the previous year), Ivanovic won her first WTA career title at the Canberra International as a qualifier, defeating lucky loser Melinda Czink in the final, 7–5, 6–1. She then went on to make her Grand Slam debut at the 2005 Australian Open, defeating Iveta Benešová and Maria Kirilenko in the first two rounds before losing to Amélie Mauresmo in the third. She then went on to make the quarter-finals in Miami (losing to Mauresmo again, having defeated Svetlana Kuznetsova and Nadia Petrova en route) and the semi-finals in Warsaw (losing to Justine Henin-Hardenne, having defeated Vera Zvonareva en route); these results saw her enter the World's Top 30 for the first time. Seeded 29th at her first French Open, Ivanovic caused an upset in the third round when she defeated Mauresmo in three sets, en route to reaching the quarter-finals in just her second appearance in the main draw of a Grand Slam tournament, where she eventually lost to Nadia Petrova. Following Wimbledon, Ivanovic entered the World's Top 20 for the first time, however an injury she suffered at the Rogers Cup caused her to be defeated in the second round of the US Open. A strong finish to the season, including two semi-finals in Zurich and Linz, saw her finish the 2005 season ranked World No. 16; subsequently, she was recognised as the WTA's "Most Improved Player" (a feat she would repeat in 2007).

Schedule
The table below shows the 2005 WTA Tour schedule.

Key

January

February

March

April

May

June

July

August

September

October

November

Titles won by nation

Rankings
Below are the 2005 WTA year-end rankings in singles competition:

Statistics

See also
 2005 ATP Tour

References

External links
 WTA tournament archive

 
WTA Tour
WTA Tour seasons